Cheiromycina is a genus of fungi belonging to the family Malmideaceae.

The genus has almost cosmopolitan distribution.

Species:

Cheiromycina flabelliformis 
Cheiromycina globosa 
Cheiromycina petri 
Cheiromycina reimeri

References

Malmideaceae
Lecanorales genera